The Fiat Mini platform is an automobile platform shared among city cars of the Fiat Group.

Specification
Developed in the late 1990s in Turin, Italy, the Mini platform was designed to be adaptable to the city cars sold by Fiat Group. The Mini platform replaced the old Panda platform (code project Type Zero; Tipo Zero in Italian) dating back to 1980. All components were totally new, and were made to be adaptable to more types of small vehicles (including hatchback, convertible and crossover SUV). The frame makes heavy use of high-strength steel. Cars built on the Mini platform can accommodate either front- or four-wheel drive, using only front-mounted transverse engines. The standard version was of the platform is designed for MacPherson strut front suspension and torsion beam rear suspension but the four wheel drive version was re-engineered with independent semi-trailing arms rear suspension and electronic Limited slip differential. A concept version was used in the 1999 Fiat Ecobasic prototype, powered by a small 1.2 JTD Multijet engine, but the first production vehicle on the platform was the Mk2 Fiat Panda in 2003 – a five-door hatchback with a high roof which allowed for increased interior space compared to most of its competitors. The architecture has been developed for production by Fiat in Poland, in Mexico by Chrysler (when the Fiat 500 was adapted for sale in the USA) and later in Italy at Pomigliano d'Arco plant (when production of the Fiat Panda Mk3 began there). The Mini platform has a wheelbase of 2,299mm in the standard version (2,305mm in 4x4 version), which is used on the Fiat Panda Mk2. In 2007, the platform spawned two smaller three-door hatchbacks: the Fiat 500 and Ford Ka Mk2. A Long wheelbase version (2,390mm) of the platform was used in the Lancia Ypsilon Mk3, launched in 2011. In 2012, the third generation of Fiat Panda was launched, again using the standard-wheelbase version, but at the 2,305mm wheelbase previously used only for the 4x4 mode. Vehicles based on Fiat Mini platform:
 1999 Fiat Ecobasic concept car
 2003—2012 Fiat Panda Mk2
 2005—2010 Fiat Panda Hydrogen
 2007—present Fiat 500
 2008—2016 Ford Ka Mk2
 2011—present Lancia Ypsilon Mk3
 2012–present Fiat Panda Mk3

Gallery

"Economy" platform
The "Economy" platform, is a chassis created for the small low cost vehicle produced by FCA in South America. It is a new platform introduced first with the Fiat Uno (codeproject 327) in 2010 assembly in Betim, Brasil. Fiat said "the Panda and Uno were born together in design and share the same concept, but have no mechanical parts in common". Fiat claims that the Uno uses 82% new components, being based on the old Fiat Palio.
A long wheelbase version was also used in the second generation of Palio (326) and Grand Siena (326 3V). In 2014 Fiat introduced the Brazilian Fiorino based on the modified Uno (327) chassis with rear axle from the Fiat Strada pick up, and in 2016 the smaller Fiat Mobi introduced a new version of the Economy platform engineering to a lower cost.

The successor of the FCA Economy platform was the new FCA MP1 (Modular Platform 1) chassis introduced in 2017 with the new Fiat Argo

Vehicles based on Fiat Economy ("Low Cost") platform:
 2010-2021 Fiat Uno (327)
 2011-2017 Fiat Palio (326)
 2012-2021 Fiat Grand Siena (326) / Dodge Vision
 2013-present Fiat Fiorino (327) / Ram ProMaster Rapid/Ram V700 Rapid
 2016-present Fiat Mobi
 2022-present Peugeot Partner Rapid (327)

Gallery

References

M
M